Mashpee Wampanoag Indian Museum is a cultural center in the town of Mashpee in Barnstable County, Massachusetts, United States. The town of Mashpee is the location of the Mashpee Wampanoag Tribe, one of the two federally recognized representative bodies of the Wampanoag people. The museum ground itself is well known for the Avant House as well as hosting the Mill Pond Herring Ladder, a Fish ladder on the Mashpee River. The museum was established in 1997 through a town meeting vote. Since 1999 the site has been listed under the National Register of Historic Places.

References

External links
 Mashpee Wampanoag Indian Museum - official website

Museums in Barnstable County, Massachusetts
Native American museums in Massachusetts
Mashpee Wampanoag Tribe
Mashpee, Massachusetts
National Register of Historic Places in Massachusetts